Edênia Nogueira Garcia (born 30 April 1987) is a Brazilian Paralympic swimmer who competes in international level events. She specialises in the backstroke and has won multiple World and Parapan titles including three Paralympic medals.

At the 2019 Parapan American Games, Garcia revealed that she was a lesbian during an interview.

References

1987 births
Living people
Swimmers from São Paulo
Paralympic swimmers of Brazil
LGBT swimmers
Lesbian sportswomen
Swimmers at the 2004 Summer Paralympics
Swimmers at the 2008 Summer Paralympics
Swimmers at the 2012 Summer Paralympics
Swimmers at the 2016 Summer Paralympics
Medalists at the 2004 Summer Paralympics
Medalists at the 2008 Summer Paralympics
Medalists at the 2012 Summer Paralympics
Brazilian LGBT sportspeople
Paralympic medalists in swimming
Paralympic silver medalists for Brazil
Paralympic bronze medalists for Brazil
Medalists at the 2003 Parapan American Games
Medalists at the 2011 Parapan American Games
Medalists at the 2015 Parapan American Games
Medalists at the 2019 Parapan American Games
Medalists at the World Para Swimming Championships
People from Crato, Ceará
Brazilian female backstroke swimmers
Brazilian female freestyle swimmers
S4-classified Paralympic swimmers
S3-classified Paralympic swimmers
Sportspeople from Ceará
21st-century Brazilian women